Diogenes is a genus of hermit crabs.

Diogenes alias McLaughlin & Holthuis, 2001
Diogenes avarus Heller, 1865
Diogenes bicristimanus Alcock, 1905
Diogenes biramus Morgan, 1987
Diogenes brevirostris Stimpson, 1858
Diogenes canaliculatus Komai, Reshmi & Kumar, 2013
Diogenes capricorneus Grant & McCulloch, 1906
Diogenes costatus Henderson, 1893
Diogenes crosnieri Dechancé, 1964
Diogenes custos (Fabricius, 1798)
Diogenes deflectomanus Wang & Tung, 1980
Diogenes denticulatus Chevreux & Bouvier, 1891
Diogenes dorotheae Morgan, 1991
Diogenes dubius (Herbst, 1804)
Diogenes edwardsii (DeHaan, 1849)
Diogenes extricatus Stebbing, 1910
Diogenes fasciatus Rahayu & Forest, 1995
Diogenes foresti Rahayu & Hortle, 2002
Diogenes goniochirus Forest, 1956
Diogenes granulatus Miers, 1880
Diogenes guttatus Henderson, 1888
Diogenes heteropsammicola Momoko Igawa & Makoto Kato 2017
Diogenes inglei McLaughlin & Clark, 1997
Diogenes investigatoris Alcock, 1905
Diogenes izananiae Asakura, 2006
Diogenes jousseaumei (Bouvier, 1897)
Diogenes jubatus (Nobili, 1903)
Diogenes karwarensis Nayak & Neelakantan, 1989
Diogenes klaasi Rahayu & Forest, 1995
Diogenes laevicarpus Rahayu, 1996
Diogenes lanaris Yap-Chiongco, 1937
Diogenes leptocerus Forest, 1957
Diogenes lophochir Morgan, 1989
Diogenes maclaughlinae Nayak & Neelakantan, 1985
Diogenes manaarensis (Henderson, 1893)
Diogenes mercatoris Forest, 1952
Diogenes merguiensis De Man, 1888
Diogenes miles (Fabricius, 1787)
Diogenes mixtus Lanchester, 1902
Diogenes moosai Rahayu & Forest, 1995
Diogenes nitidimanus Terao, 1913
Diogenes ortholepis Forest, 1961
Diogenes ovatus Miers, 1881
Diogenes pallescens Whitelegge, 1897
Diogenes paracristimanus Wang & Dong, 1977
Diogenes patae Asakura & Godwin, 2006
Diogenes penicillatus Stimpson, 1858
Diogenes persicus (Nobili, 1905)
Diogenes planimanus Henderson, 1893
Diogenes pugilator (Roux, 1829)
Diogenes rectimanus Miers, 1884
Diogenes senex Heller, 1865
Diogenes spinicarpus Rahayu & Forest, 1995
Diogenes spinifrons (De Haan, 1849)
Diogenes tirmiziae Siddiqui & McLaughlin, 2003
Diogenes tomentosus Wang & Tung, 1980
Diogenes tumidus Rahayu & Forest, 1995
Diogenes violaceus Henderson, 1893
Diogenes viridis Haig & Ball, 1988
Diogenes waltairensis Kamalaveni, 1950

References

Diogenidae
Decapod genera